Nightflight is Budgie's ninth album, released in October 1981 on RCA Records. A remastered version, with two live tracks from 1981, was released in 2013.
The illustration on the cover is by Derek Riggs.

Track listing

Personnel
Budgie
Burke Shelley – bass guitar, vocals
John Thomas – electric, acoustic and slide guitars, vocals
Steve Williams – drums
Production
Andrew Christian – sleeve design
Derek Riggs – Illustration
Adrian Hopkins – management

Charts
Album 

Singles

References

Budgie (band) albums
1981 albums
New Wave of British Heavy Metal albums
RCA Records albums